Mark Ricketts may refer to:
Mark Ricketts (footballer) (born 1984), English footballer
Mark Scott Ricketts (born 1955), American illustrator and cartoonist